Pterognathia is a genus of worms belonging to the family Pterognathiidae.

The genus has almost cosmopolitan distribution.

Species

Species:

Pterognathia alcicornis 
Pterognathia atrox 
Pterognathia crocodilus

References

Gnathostomulida
Platyzoa genera